= Laphystiopsidae =

Scientific classification
- Domain: Eukaryota
- Kingdom: Animalia
- Phylum: Arthropoda
- Class: Malacostraca
- Order: Amphipoda
- Superfamily: Iphimedioidea
- Family: Laphystiopsidae

Family of crustaceans

Laphystiopsidae is a family of crustaceans belonging to the order Amphipoda.

Genera:

- Laphystiopsis Sars, 1893
- Prolaphystiopsis Schellenberg, 1931
- Prolaphystius Barnard, 1930
